The World Trade Centre Hull & Humber was a world trade centre located in Kingston upon Hull, England and opened in 2008 after the completion of the building in 2007. It provides a service for UK based organisations looking to operate at an international level and also offers a specific entry point for global organisations looking to do business in the Humber region. The building is located at Humber Quays in Hull's waterfront and business district. The WTC Hull & Humber is located within walking distance of Hull Paragon Interchange and is a short drive from the City's docks.

The company was dissolved in 2017.

See also 
 List of World Trade Centers

References

External links
 Official site

Buildings and structures in Kingston upon Hull
World Trade Centers
Buildings and structures completed in 2007